The Minister of Science and Sport was a position in the Canadian government occupied by Kirsty Duncan from July 19, 2018, to November 21, 2019.

The position was created as a result of a merge between:

 the Minister for Sport; and
 the Minister for Science

After November 21, 2019, the responsibilities for this position were redistributed between:

 the Minister of Innovation, Science and Industry; and
 the Minister of Canadian Heritage (sports)

References 

Canada_Minister_of_Science_and_Sport
Canada_Minister_of_Science_and_Sport

Science_and_Sport